Chełm Palace is a palace in Chełm, Poland that was built in 1822. It is registered as an object of cultural heritage. The building is a part of the palace complex that additionally includes: a park, an outbuilding and a cowshed from the 19th or 20th century.

Notes

References 

Tourist attractions in Lower Silesian Voivodeship
Palaces in Poland